José Vega (born 28 October 1958) is an Ecuadorian footballer. He played in nine matches for the Ecuador national football team from 1983 to 1987. He was also part of Ecuador's squad for the 1983 Copa América tournament.

References

1958 births
Living people
Ecuadorian footballers
Footballers from Quito
Ecuador international footballers
Association football midfielders